Chah Chenar (also Romanized as Chāh Chenār) is a village in Bakesh-e Yek Rural District, in the Central District of Mamasani County, Fars Province, Iran. At the 2006 census, its population was 76, in 21 families.

References 

Populated places in Mamasani County